The National Committee to Defeat the Mundt Bill AKA "NCDMB" (1948-1950) was an American organization that sought to oppose passage of the Mundt-Nixon Bill and subject of a 15-page report of the House Un-American Activities Committee, two of whose members were US Representatives Karl E. Mundt and Richard M. Nixon.

History

Background

In early 1948, US Representatives Mundt and Nixon began formulating an anti-communist bill, formally House Resolution 5852, Subversive Activities Control Act of 1948, which passed the House in May 1948.

Activities
On June 1, 1948, Henry A. Wallace supporters visibly "took command" of a march on Washington to stop the Mundt-Nixon Bill from passing the Senate.  Former congressional representative Jerry J. O'Connell became chairman of a "Committee to Defeat the Mundt Bill."  The committee claimed that more than 5,000 would march on Washington on June 2. In early June 1948, the bill died in the US Senate as the 1948 United States presidential election season commenced with conventions.  (See Mundt-Nixon Bill.)

The group continued existence long enough to face the next iteration of the Mundt-Nixon Bill, namely the Mundt–Ferguson Communist Registration Bill AKA the "Mundt-Ferguson Bill."

It is unclear when exactly the group dissolved.  During hearings in 1955, O'Connell indicated that NCDMB ended when Congress overruled President Truman's veto of the Subversive Activities Control Act of 1950, more commonly known as the McCarran Internal Security Act, i.e., September 22, 1950.  HUAC's annual report for 1950 cited an unspecified date in September 1950.

HUAC report

On December 7, 1950, HUAC issued a 15-page Report on National Committee to Defeat the Mundt Bill:  A Communist Lobby.  At that time, HUAC's senior investigator was Louis J. Russell and director of research Benjamin Mandel.  HUAC had successfully subpoenaed months of Western Union telegrams and telephone records between the committee and the National Lawyers Guild and tied both organizations to the Communist Party USA (CPUSA) and numerous Communist front organizations.  HUAC also cited testimony from FBI undercover agent Matthew Cvetic.

The report concluded:  The Committee on Un-American Activities is unanimous in its belief that the National Committee to Defeat the Mundt Bill was organized not as a legitimate lobbying enterprise, but rather as a propaganda adjunct of the Communist Party. The work of this organization, in many instances, was performed by the Communist Party, and it was at all times wholly supported by the Communist Party.  (Note:  The report states its "belief.")

Organization
A number of NCDMB supporters also supported US Vice President Henry A. Wallace and his Progressive Party including Leo Isaacson, Arthur Miller, Louis Untermeyer, and Mark Van Doren (listed under "sponsors" below).

Structure

The NCDMB has the following sub-organizations:  

 Chicago Committee to Defeat the Mundt Bill
 Freedom House Committee to Defeat the Mundt Bill (Miami)
 New York Committee to Defeat the Mundt Bill
 San Francisco Committee to Oppose the Mundt-Ferguson Bill
 Santa Cruz Citizens Committee to Defeat the Mundt Bill
 Delaware Committee to Defeat the Mundt bill
 Philadelphia Committee to Defeat the Mundt Bill
 New Jersey Citizens Committee Against the Mundt Bill
 Colorado Committee to Defeat the Mundt Bill

Major financial contributors to NCDMB included:  
 Mrs. Luke I. Wilson (executive board member of the Southern Conference for Human Welfare)
 United Electrical, Radio and Machine Workers of America (UE)
 New York Committee to Defeat the Mundt Bill (led by Isadore Blumberg)
 Elisabeth Sasuly
 Thomas G. Buchanan Jr. (legislative director of the Civil Rights Congress)
 George B. Murphy Jr. (vice chairman of the American Committee for the Protection of Foreign Born and vice president of the International Workers Order).

Members

NCDMB Officers included: 

 Jerry J. O'Connell, chairman and registered lobbyist
 Bruce Waybur, treasurer
 Edith Pratt, executive treasurer
 John B. Stone, registered lobbyist

NCDMB sponsors included:

 Rabbi Michael Alper
 Hon. Thurman Arnold
 Stringfellow Barr
 Mr. and Mrs. Theodore O. Behre
 Angela Bambace
 Elmer Austin Benson
 Hon. John T. Bernard
 Edwin Bjorkman
 Algernon D. Black
 Scott Buchanan
 Dr. Robert K. Burns
 LaVonne Busch
 Angus Cameron
 Prof. A. J. Carlson
 Prof. Zechariah Chafee
 Rabbi J. X. Cohen
 Hon. Benjamin J. Davis
 Earl B. Dickerson
 James Durkin
 Clifford J. Durr
 Prof. Thomas I. Emerson
 Prof. Henry Pratt Fairchild
 Edward E. Fisher
 Abram Flaxer
 Clark Foreman
 Rev. Stephen H. Fritchman
 Jerry Gilliam
 J. W. Gitt
 Percy Greene
 Prof. Fowler Harper
 Donald Henderson
 Charles Hamilton Houston
 Rev. Kenneth DeP. Hughes
 James Imbrie
 Hon. Leo Isacson
 Francis Fisher Kane
 Robert W. Kenny
 Paul J. Kern
 Prof. Curtis D. MacDougall
 James McLeish
 Rev. Jack McMichael
 Dr. Alexander Meiklejohn
 Samuel D. Menin
 Arthur Miller
 Hon. Fred G. Moritt
 Prof. Stuart Mudd
 Hon. Stanley Novak
 Grant Oakes
 Oliver T. Palmer
 Father Clarence Parker
 Max Perlow
 Morris Pizer
 Abraham Pomerantz
 Judge Joseph H. Rainey
 Prof. William G. Rice
 O. John Rogge
 Paul Ross
 Prof. Frederick L. Schuman
 Prof. Karl Shapiro
 Prof. Harlow Shapley
 I.F. Stone
 Dr. Joseph W. Straley
 Dr. Alva W. Taylor
 Mary Church Terrell
 Louis Untermeyer
 Mark Van Doren
 Dr. Harry F. Ward
 Mary van Kleeck

A House document states that US Senator James E. Murray of Montana had close Communist front ties with the Daily Worker newspaper, Soviet Russia Today magazine, the National Lawyers Guild, and the International Workers Order as well as known affiliation with Jerry J. O'Connell of NCMDB.

Works
    Report on National Committee to Defeat the Mundt Bill:  A Communist Lobby

See also

 Mundt-Nixon Bill
 Mundt–Ferguson Communist Registration Bill
 McCarran Internal Security Act

References

External links
 Report on National Committee to Defeat the Mundt Bill:  A Communist Lobby
 Wayne State University:  Reuther Library:  Civil Rights Congress of Michigan Collection
 Getty Images:  Member of "Committee to Defeat the Mundt Bill" picket the White House (June 1948)

 

Organizations established in 1948
Political advocacy groups in the United States
Progressivism in the United States
Liberalism in the United States
1948 establishments in the United States
United States political action committees
Left-wing politics